Jorunn Johnsen (24 November 1905 – 1 May 1984) was a Norwegian journalist.

Johnsen studied in Berlin and Oslo, and worked three years at Christianssands Tidende before being hired at Aftenposten in 1936, where she reported for the rest of  career. Johnsen specialized in reporting on social issues. From January 1944 to March 1945, Johnsen was imprisoned in Grini concentration camp for "German-hostile behaviour", during the German occupation of Norway.

Johnsen was awarded the Narvesen Prize in 1957, and also received the HM The King's Medal of Merit.

Jorunn Johnsen died in May 1984 in Oslo.

References

1905 births
1984 deaths
Grini concentration camp survivors
Recipients of the King's Medal of Merit
20th-century Norwegian writers
20th-century Norwegian journalists